Tamfourhill is a working-class residential suburb of Falkirk within the Falkirk (council area), Scotland. It is located approximately 1.5 miles (2.5 kilometres) west of the city centre. The Falkirk Wheel is located just to the northwest of the village. Tamfourhill includes the residential area between the south side of the Forth & Clyde Canal and the north side of the Union Canal. It also contains the Tamfourhill Industrial Estate. To the west of the village is a well preserved part of the Antonine Wall, built in the 2nd century and Rough Castle.

References

External links

Antonine Wall - Tamfourhill Camp
Roman Britain - Tamfourhill Camp

Villages in Falkirk (council area)